Mohammad Javad Ezzati (born January 10, 1982) is an Iranian actor. He has received critical acclaim for his work in a wide range of genres. As of 2019, Ezzati's starring films have grossed 150 billion toman and accumulated more than 18 million tickets, making him the highest-grossing actor in Iran. He has received various accolades, including two Hafez Awards, an Iran's Film Critics and Writers Association Award and an Urban International Film Festival Award, in addition to nominations for three Crystal Simorghs and an Iran Cinema Celebration Award.

Career 

Ezzati began his acting career at age 15 with working in theatre. He made his Television debut in Night Tales (2002), Mozaffar's Garden (2006), Man of Many Faces (2008), 50-50 of a Shop (2011) and gained recognition for his role as Latif in Great Troubles (2014–2015) for which he received his first Hafez Awards nomination.

He also made his film debut with a small role in Homayoon Asadian's Gold and Copper (2010).

He received his second Hafez Awards nomination for playing a young man who has written a book about young peoples sexual needs which no one accepts to publish, in In Due Course (2015).

After playing many comedic roles, he played his first dramatic role in the 2017 two-part film series Midday Adventures, he received critical acclaim and two Fajr Film Festival nominations and won a Hafez Awards for playing a member from Iranian Revolutionary Intelligence Service who are trying to arrest militant members and commanders of a terrorist group in the two-part drama thriller and political Midday Adventures (2017) / Midday Adventures: Trace of Blood (2019).

He gained attention and received a Hafez Awards nomination for playing in the romantic drama Lottery (2018) with less than 15-ish minutes of screen time.

In 2019, he starred in the comedy box office hit Centipede. the film broke several box office records and In the fifth week of its theatrical run, became the highest-grossing film in Iran at that time.

The film has become a major box office success in Iran, grossing 30 billion toman in less than 2 months and surpassing 4 million ticket sales in its first 45 days.

In 2020, he played five different dramatic roles including playing in Sun Children that was selected as the Iranian entry for the Best International Feature Film at the 93rd Academy Awards, making the shortlist of fifteen films.

In Atabai (2020) he played Yahya, a man who speak Turkish, It earned Ezzati his third Fajr Film Festival nomination and his acting was praised by the critics.

In Drown (2020), he played the leading role. The film and actors received generally positive reviews from critics but he was snubbed by the 38th Fajr Film Festival. However the film scored the most nominations—12—and has received the most wins–5–.

The film premiered on 2020 June 24 and began streaming on Namava & Filimo on 2021 March 31. It became the most watched film on these platforms (online releases).

Despite the film received mixed reviews but Ezzati's acting in Amphibious (2020) was met critical acclaim. Massoud Farasati said "The relationship between Ezzati and Elham Akhavan reminds me of Akira Kurosawa's Red Beard (1965)."

On April 13, 2021, it was announced that Javad Ezzati will star in the neo-noir mystery drama series Mortal Wound. The series is based on The Tragedy of Macbeth by William Shakespeare.

The first episode was released on June 4, 2021. the series recorded the highest average rating of 99% for a drama on Filimo with its first three episodes, it received mostly positive reviews, with overall praise for Ezzati's performance. The series became the most-watched home video series in Iran.

Him and Mohammad Hossein Mahdavian the director of the series, are frequent collaborators in Iran cinema. they have collaborated five times in Midday Adventures (2017), Lottery (2018), Midday Adventures: Trace of Blood (2019), Mortal Wound (2021) and The Loser Man (2022).

Filmography

Film

Web

Television

Theatre

Awards and nominations

References

External links

Persian Article on WP

1982 births
Living people
Iranian male film actors
Iranian male stage actors
Iranian male television actors
21st-century Iranian male actors
Iranian comedians
Male actors from Tehran